The Gymnasium Carolinum in Ansbach, Germany, was founded by George the Pious, Margrave of Brandenburg-Ansbach in Ansbach, the former Onolzbach, in 1528. It is reputedly the oldest and smallest of the three Gymnasiums in Ansbach.
By the time it developed to the centre of education in the Ansbach ″Unterland". 
The school moved to its present building in 1736 which was planned as a prison in 1727, but changed to a Gymnasium in 1736. After the closure of the “Fürstenschule Heilsbronn“ the  “Lateinschule“ (Latin school) of Ansbach was promoted to Gymnasium Carolinum Illustre (“Stiftungsbrief“ (letter of foundation) dated 1 May 1737). The Gymnasium was named after its  patron, Karl Wilhelm Friedrich, Margrave of Brandenburg-Ansbach.

Ansbach school attack 
On 17 September 2009 the Ansbach school attack took place at the school. 16 people were injured, including the perpetrator. Two suffered life threatening injuries.

References

External links
 Gymnasium Carolinum school website
 German Wikinews: Amoklauf an Schule in Ansbach

1528 establishments in the Holy Roman Empire
Gymnasiums in Germany
Educational institutions established in the 1520s
Education in Ansbach
Buildings and structures in Ansbach
Schools in Bavaria